The Queen and Crescent Limited was a named passenger train operated by the Southern Railway in the United States of America. It was operated over a historic route that had been established in the late 1800s called the Queen and Crescent Route, which referred to Cincinnati as the "Queen City" and New Orleans as the "Crescent City".

The train began service in 1926 and it was never a financial success.  The Southern Railway operated the Queen and Crescent Limited from Cincinnati, Ohio to New Orleans, Louisiana via Lexington, Kentucky, Chattanooga, Tennessee, Birmingham, Alabama and Meridian, Mississippi.  The new train carried both coaches and Pullman sleepers and a dining car. Its road numbers on the Southern Railway were #43 (southbound) and #44 (northbound).

Accidents
 On the first year of operation, the train derailed on October 15, 1926, one half mile south of Williamstown, Kentucky.  One engineer died and another was seriously injured, but no passengers died.

 On February 4, 1947, the Queen and Crescent struck a car and killed three persons near New Orleans.

End of service
The Queen and Crescent was removed from the timetable by 1949 and only a remnant remained: Southern operated Train numbers 43 and 44 between Birmingham, Alabama and Meridian, Mississippi as a local.

References

Night trains of the United States
Railway services introduced in 1926
Passenger rail transportation in Alabama
Passenger rail transportation in Kentucky
Passenger rail transportation in Louisiana
Passenger rail transportation in Mississippi
Passenger rail transportation in Ohio
Passenger rail transportation in Tennessee
Passenger trains of the Southern Railway (U.S.)
Named passenger trains of the United States